Oscar is a British TV serial first transmitted by BBC 2 in March 1985. All three episodes were directed by Henry Herbert, 17th Earl of Pembroke. Michael Gambon portrayed Oscar Wilde while other actors included Robin Lermitte as Lord Alfred Douglas, Tim Hardy as Alfred Taylor, Emily Richard as Constance Wilde and Norman Rodway as the Marquis of Queensberry. The serial concentrated on Wilde's trials and time in prison.

External links

1980s British drama television series
BBC television dramas
Period television series
1985 British television series debuts
1985 British television series endings
Films directed by Henry Herbert